is a Japanese magical girl manga series written and illustrated by Taeko Ikeda. It was originally serialized in Shogakukan's shōjo magazine Ciao from August 1994 to September 1995, collecting into 3 tankōbon volumes. An anime series based on the manga was created by Nippon Animation and was broadcast on all MBS stations in Japan from September 3, 1994, through August 26, 1995.

An English language-version titled Super Pig was produced by Saban Entertainment in 1997. This dub aired in New Zealand on TV2. From 1998 to 1999 the Saban dub aired in the Netherlands on Fox Kids with Dutch subtitles. Another English dub aired only in the Philippines under the title Super Boink; this dub kept all the original music.

Plot
Karin Kokubu (Kassie Carlen) is late for school one day when she comes across an apparently injured yellow pig. It turns out the pig wasn't injured, just hungry, and he gets back his health when he eats Karin's apple. When Karin gets to her school, called Sei Ringo Gakuen (St. Ringo School), she discovers that the pig has stowed away in her backpack, which gets her into trouble with her teacher Makoto Arashiyama (Fowley Fatback).

Later, she meets the pig again and finds out he can talk and fly. The pig gives her a "Dream Tonpact" which she opens, and a pig snout appears from it and attaches itself to her nose. She finds the pig again who explains that he is actually Prince Tonrariano the 3rd (Iggy Pig) of the apple-shaped planet Buringo (Oinko). He tells her how she can transform: by saying "Ba Bi Bu Be Burin!" she transforms into a superpowered pink piglet called Tonde Burin (Super Pig). This is not something Karin is happy about at all, as she'd rather transform into a magical girl heroine like her idol, the tokusatsu character "Cutey Chao" (who is possibly a reference to Cutie Honey). Tonrariāno (who she calls Ton-chan) tells her if she can collect 108 pearls by doing good deeds as Burin, she can do so. The pearl collection operates on karma, meaning if Burin abuses her powers, she will lose pearls.

Whenever someone is in danger, Karin becomes Tonde Burin to thwart the crisis and uses her new abilities to help other people in need.

Characters

Main characters
  / Kassie Carlen (Saban) / Colleen Adams (Philippines dub)
 ; Dada Carlos (Philippines dub)
 The main protagonist of the series. Karin Kokubu is an ordinary 13-year-old schoolgirl in 7th grade who comes across Tonrariano the 3rd one day while on her way to school and gives him an apple. When she gets to school, Karin discovers that the pig has stowed away in her bag, which causes her more trouble. Later, she meets the pig again and finds out he can talk and fly. Karin finds a compact which she opens and a pig snout appears from it and attaches itself to her nose! Karin learns that Tonrariano comes from the Buringo World and that she can transform into Tonde Burin, the Pig Girl of Love and Courage. Tonrariano tells her if she can collect 108 pearls by doing good deeds as Burin she can take on another hero form. There is another drawback to the Tonde Burin alias...If anyone finds out her identity, she will be stuck in the form of a pig for the rest of her life. Karin has a crush on Koichi Mizuno, who happens to like Burin. She has a hobby in painting. When in her Burin alias, she worries about her secret being found out by her father, her little brother, and Jimmy Matsumoto.

  / Iggy Pig (Saban) / Binky Arnold the 3rd (Philippines dub)
 ; Weng Raganit (Philippines dub)
 Tonrariano the 3rd is a yellow pig who is a prince from Buuringo and the son of Tonrariano the 2nd. Tonrariano the 3rd came to Earth to undergo a trial to become king. He was found by Karin, who he chose to become Burin, and later starts to live in Karin's room. He is carefree and well-read, yet regrets that Karin hates her Burin plight. Like Burin, Tonrariano can fly and acts as an advisor to Burin. On some occasions, Tonrariano can dress up as Tonde Burin in events in which Karin and Tonde Burin are to be in the same area.

Supporting characters
  / Prudence Plumm (Saban) / Jean Smith (Philippines dub) 
 ; Charmaine Cordoviz (Philippines dub, episodes 5+)
 Masami Yamakawa is Karin's best friend who is on the tennis team. She often encourages her in love matters and other things where she often helps her out. Masami has a crush on Hiromi Kashiwagi.

  / Penny Round (Saban) / Suzie (Philippines dub) 
 ; Weng Raganit (Philippines dub)
 Kaoru Hidaka is the class cutie in Karin's class. Unlike Karin, Kaoru has a shy personality and is also full of all kinds of fears. She is an expert at cooking and often prepares refreshments for the soccer team.

  / Lance Romero
 
 Koichi Mizuno is a first-year student and the captain of the school soccer team. Even though he has to put up with every female student having a crush on him (which also includes Karin and Kaoru), Koichi actually has a crush on Tonde Burin (who he's a fan of) unaware that she is actually Karin.

  / Radford Tammack
 
 Takuma Mushanokoji is a student in Karin's class and an expert tennis player who has a crush on her and is admired by Keiko Kuroha.

  / Harley Hoover
 
 Hiromi Kashiwagi is a student in Karin's class and a close friend of Koichi. He is known for his adventurous spirit and occasional mean comments.

  / Milton Massen
 
 Jimmy Matsumoto is a nerd in Karin's class who has developed a crush on Kaoru Hidaka. He is good at astronomy, movie making, and science. He begins investigating the appearance of Tonde Burin, which makes Karin nervous.

  / Heather Hogwarsh (Saban) / Macy Kramer (Philippines dub)
 ; Charmaine Cordoviz (Philippines dub, episodes 5+)
 Keiko Kuroha is the class representative who is Karin Kokubu's rival. She is the sole daughter of a wealthy businessman that owns a huge enterprise called the Kuroha Group. She has a crush on Takuma Mushanokoji and always thinks that Karin is trying to steal him from her. Keiko is not welcomed by the other girls in her class because she's arrogant, gossipy, boastful about her wealth, and nosy about other students' affairs. Since her parents are always away, Keiko's only companions are a pet alligator and a pet octopus. She knows how to control the air as seen in one episode where she operated a hot air balloon as well as operated an airship in the last episode.

  / Ken Carlen (Saban) / Vince Adams (Philippines dub)
 ; Chamaine Cordoviz (Philippines dub, episodes 5+)
 Shinichiro Kokubu is the 38-year-old father of Karin. He works as the editor-in-chief at a local newspaper called the Akebono Times and is often seen toting a camera around. Ever since Tonde Burin showed up, Shinichiro has been on the trail to get a scoop on her.

 
 
 Rikako Kokuba is the 34-year-old fashion designer who is Karin's mother.

 
 
 Shuhei Kokuba is the 9-year-old brother of Karin Kokubu who is a fan of Tonde Burin.

  / Fowley Fatback
 
 Makoto Arashiyama is the social studies teacher at St. Ringo School who is also the coach of the soccer team and the staff sponsor. Makoto also has a secret crush on Nanako Tateishi. He is pressured by his relatives to marry. When the pressure becomes excessive, Makoto doesn't return home for the new year.

  / Teacher Jodie (Philippines dub)
  (Japanese); Weng Raganit (Philippines dub)
 Nanako Tateishi is the school nurse at St. Ringo School. Nanako is much welcomed by the students and is admired by the other male teachers, where each one tries to get her to go one a date with them. Nanako bears a resemblance to Cutey Chao and either volunteers or is forced several times to dress like her. She is also a fan of female professional wrestling.

 
 
 Kondo Masayoshi is the tennis coach at St. Ringo School who is a fan of "Cutey Chao". He is always competing against Makoto Arashiyama for the attention of Nanako Tateishi.

  / Theodorix Pig
 
 Tonrariano the 2nd is the King of Buringo World and the father of Tonrariano the 3rd. Tonrariano the 2nd sent Tonrariano the 3rd to Earth to undergo a trial that would enable his son to become the next king. He is not seen in the series but often contacts his son through the Dream Tonpact. Tonrariano the 2nd plays a key role in Burin's scoring, as he decides how many pearls she gets for every heroic action that she does.

Other characters
 
 The Kobuta are a red pig, a green pig, and a blue pig who appear on the show to emphasize a joke.

 
 
 Butan is a professional wrestler dressed up as Tonde Burin, who she admires. She makes a good substitute when someone makes a movie of Tonde Burin.

 
 
 Goro Tatsumaki is the leader of a soccer team at Warasuno Junior High School and the older brother of Hitomi Tatsumaki. He is always seen with two unnamed friends of his and prefers to use tricks so that his soccer team can win.

 
 
 Hitomi Tatsumaki is the younger sister of Goro Tatsumaki. She is in the same class as Shuhei Kokuba.

 Kinoshita
 Kinoshita is the butler and chauffeur of the Kuroha Family who is Keiko's only human companion.

Media

Manga
A "pilot" story titled  appeared in the fall 1993 issue of Ciao DX. The manga series subsequently appeared in Ciao from the October 1994 issue through the September 1995 issue. The tankōbon, or collections, were released in three volumes by Shogakukan's Flower Comics label.
 Volume 1,  (released April 1995)
 Volume 2,  (released August 1995)
 Volume 3,  (released October 1995)

Anime
The anime aired on TVB Jade in Hong Kong and on TVBS and TTV in Taiwan.

An English language-version titled Super Pig was produced by Saban Entertainment in 1997. This dub aired in New Zealand on TV2. From 1998 to 1999 the Saban dub aired in the Netherlands on Fox Kids with Dutch subtitles, and from 2003 to 2004 a Dutch dub based on the Saban dub aired also on Fox Kids. In Poland a Polish dub based on the Saban dub aired on Fox Kids and TVN. In Italy an Italian dub based on the Saban dub aired on Fox Kids between 2001 and 2002. In South America, Germany, Brazil, Russia, Spain, Portugal, and Israel, translated versions of the Saban dub also aired.

Another English dub aired only in the Philippines under the title Super Boink.

Openings

Lyricist: Manami Tōno / Composer: Tsugumi Kataoka / Arranger: Tsugumi Kataoka / Singers: Parquets

Endings

Lyricist: Manami Tōno / Composer: Tsugumi Kataoka / Arranger: Tsugumi Kataoka / Singers: Parquets

Saban episode list

Japanese original episode list

References

External links
 
 

1994 manga
1994 Japanese television series debuts
1994 anime television series debuts
1995 Japanese television series endings
Japanese children's animated action television series
Japanese children's animated adventure television series
Japanese children's animated comedy television series
Japanese children's animated fantasy television series
Japanese children's animated superhero television series
Magical girl anime and manga
Mainichi Broadcasting System original programming
Nippon Animation
Shogakukan manga
Shōjo manga
Television series by Disney–ABC Domestic Television
TBS Television (Japan) original programming
TVB
Fictional pigs